Winning Widows is a British television sitcom which first aired on ITV between 1961 and 1962. It stars Peggy Mount and Avice Landone as Martha and Mildred, two widowed sisters who move in together.

Other actors who appeared in the series include Thorley Walters, Carole Shelley, Anthony Sagar, Willoughby Goddard, Harold Goodwin, Hugh Paddick, John Junkin, Davy Kaye, Barbara Hicks, Graham Stark, Joe Melia, Ronnie Stevens, Anneke Wills and Bernard Cribbins.

Only two of the thirteen episodes are known to survive.

References

Bibliography
 Howard Maxford. Hammer Complete: The Films, the Personnel, the Company. McFarland, 2018.
  Carl Rhodes & Robert Westwood. Critical Representations of Work and Organization in Popular Culture. Routledge, 2007.

External links
 

ITV sitcoms
1961 British television series debuts
1962 British television series endings
1960s British comedy television series
English-language television shows
Television shows produced by Associated Television (ATV)